Waderai Ka Beta is satirical comedy song released in June 2012 by Ali Gul Pir. The song hits out at the typical feudal culture found in Pakistan.

Satirical Message
The video and the lyrics revolves around a guy who boasts about his family power, status and money. The song satirically points at the lavish life style of a feudal in Pakistan. Commenting about the song the singer Ali Gul Pir said, "The track is a dig at influential people who misuse their authority, The subject could be anyone from the sons of bureaucrats to tribal leaders."

Reception
The song became an instant hit soon after it was first uploaded on YouTube on June 14, 2012.

See also
Aalu Anday
Sab Paisay Ki Game Hai
Beghairat Brigade

References

External links
 
 

Political songs
Pakistani songs
2012 songs